Friend Humphrey House is a historic home located at Colonie in Albany County, New York. It is named after Friend Humphrey, former New York Senate member and former mayor of Albany.  It was built about 1841 and is a two-story frame farmhouse with a gable roof and two symmetrically placed chimneys.  A one-story ell was added about 1880.  It is a transitional vernacular Greek Revival / Federal style dwelling.

It was listed on the National Register of Historic Places in 1985.

References

Houses on the National Register of Historic Places in New York (state)
Federal architecture in New York (state)
Houses completed in 1841
Houses in Albany County, New York
National Register of Historic Places in Albany County, New York